A vigesimal or base-20 (base-score) numeral system is based on twenty (in the same way in which the decimal numeral system is based on ten). Vigesimal is derived from the Latin adjective , meaning 'twentieth'.

Places 
In a vigesimal place system, twenty individual numerals (or digit symbols) are used, ten more than in the usual decimal system. This is similar to the common computer-science practice of writing hexadecimal numerals over 9 with the letters "A–F". Another less common method skips over the letter "I", in order to avoid confusion between I20 as eighteen and one, so that the number eighteen is written as J20, and nineteen is written as K20.

According to this notation:
 is equivalent to forty in decimal = 
 is equivalent to two hundred and sixty in decimal = 
 is equivalent to four hundred in decimal = .

In the rest of this article below, numbers are expressed in decimal notation, unless specified otherwise. For example, 10 means ten, 20 means twenty. Numbers in vigesimal notation use the convention that I means eighteen and J means nineteen.

Fractions 
As 20 is divisible by two and five and is adjacent to 21, the product of three and seven, thus covering the first four prime numbers, many vigesimal fractions have simple representations, whether terminating or recurring (although thirds are more complicated than in decimal, repeating two digits instead of one). In decimal, dividing by three twice (ninths) only gives one digit periods ( = 0.1111.... for instance) because 9 is the number below ten. 21, however, the number adjacent to 20 that is divisible by 3, is not divisible by 9. Ninths in vigesimal have six-digit periods. As 20 has the same prime factors as 10 (two and five), a fraction will terminate in decimal if and only if it terminates in vigesimal.

Cyclic numbers 

The prime factorization of twenty is 22 × 5, so it is not a perfect power. However, its squarefree part, 5, is congruent to 1 (mod 4). Thus, according to Artin's conjecture on primitive roots, vigesimal has infinitely many cyclic primes, but the fraction of primes that are cyclic is not necessarily ~37.395%. An UnrealScript program that computes the lengths of recurring periods of various fractions in a given set of bases found that, of the first 15,456 primes, ~39.344% are cyclic in vigesimal.

Real numbers

Use
In many European languages, 20 is used as a base, at least with respect to the linguistic structure of the names of certain numbers (though a thoroughgoing consistent vigesimal system, based on the powers 20, 400, 8000 etc., is not generally used).

Africa
Vigesimal systems are common in Africa, for example in Yoruba. While the Yoruba number system may be regarded as a vigesimal system, it is complex.

Americas
 Twenty is a base in the Maya and Aztec number systems. See Maya numerals and Maya calendar, Nahuatl language.

 The Inuit-Yupik-Unangax languages have base-20 number systems. In 1994, Inuit students in Kaktovik, Alaska, came up with the base-20 Kaktovik numerals to better represent their language. Before this invention led to a revival, the Inuit numerals had been falling out of use.

Asia
 Dzongkha, the national language of Bhutan, has a full vigesimal system, with numerals for the powers of 20, 400, 8,000 and 160,000. 
Atong, a language spoken in the South Garo Hills of Meghalaya state, Northeast India, and adjacent areas in Bangladesh, has a full vigesimal system that is nowadays considered archaic.
 In Santali, a Munda language of India, "fifty" is expressed by the phrase bār isī gäl, literally "two twenty ten." Likewise, in Didei, another Munda language spoken in India, complex numerals are decimal to 19 and decimal-vigesimal to 399.
 The Burushaski number system is base-20. For example, 20 altar, 40 alto-altar (2 times 20), 60 iski-altar (3 times 20) etc.
 In East Asia, the Ainu language also uses a counting system that is based around the number 20. "" is 20, "" (ten more until two twenties) is 30, "" (two twenties) is 40, "" (five twenties) is 100. Subtraction is also heavily used, e.g. "" (one more until ten) is 9.
 The Chukchi language has a vigesimal numeral system.

Oceania
There is some evidence of base-20 usage in the Māori language of New Zealand as seen in the terms Te Hokowhitu a Tu referring to a war party (literally "the seven 20s of Tu") and Tama-hokotahi, referring to a great warrior ("the one man equal to 20").

Caucasus
In the Central Caucasus a vigesimal system is used by the Ingush.

Europe

 Twenty is used as a base number in the French names of numbers from 70 to 99, except in the French of Belgium, Switzerland, the Democratic Republic of the Congo, Rwanda, the Aosta Valley and the Channel Islands.
 Twenty is used as a base number in the Danish names of tens from 50 to 90. For example,  (short for ) means 3 times 20, i.e. 60. However, Danish numerals are not vigesimal since it is only the names of some of the tens that are etymologically formed in a vigesimal way. In contrast with e.g. French , the units only go from zero to nine between each ten which is a defining trait of a decimal system. For details, see Danish numerals.
 Twenty is used as a base number in the Breton names of numbers from 40 to 49 and from 60 to 99.
 Twenty is used as a base number in Welsh from numbers up to 50 and from 60 to 100, although since the 1940s a decimal counting system has come to be preferred. However, the vigesimal system exclusively is used for ordinal numbers and is still required in telling the time, money, and with weights and measures.  means 'two twenties' i.e. 40,  means 'three twenties' i.e. 60, etc.  means 57 (two on fifteen and twenty). Prior to its withdrawal from circulation,  (note of sixscore) was the nickname for the ten-shilling (120 pence) note; due to 120 pence = half a pound sterling. the term  continues to be used to mean 50 pence in modern Welsh and phrases like  ('50p piece') is also not uncommon.
Nowadays a decimal system is taught in schools, but the vigesimal system is still used by many, particularly older speakers.
 Twenty is traditionally used as a base number in Manx Gaelic, with  being 30 (ten and twenty),  40 (two twenties),  50 (ten and two twenties),  60 (three twenty) and so on.
 Twenty is used as a base number in Albanian. The word for 40 means "two times 20". The Arbëreshë in Italy may use  for 60. Formerly,  was also used for 80. Today Cham Albanians in Greece use all  numbers. Basically, 20 means 1 , 40 means 2 , 60 means 3  and 80 means 4 . Albanian is the only language in the Balkans which has retained elements of the vigesimal numeral system side by side with decimal system. The existence of the two systems in Albanian reflect the contribution of Pre-Indo-European people of the Balkans to the formation of the Paleo-Balkan Indo-European tribes and their language.
 Twenty is used as a base number in Georgian for numbers 30 to 99. For example, 31 literally means, twenty-and-eleven. 67 is said as, "three-twenty-and-seven".
 Twenty is used as a base number in the Nakh languages.
 Twenty is used as a base number in Basque for numbers up to 100. The words for 40, 60 and 80 mean "two-score", "three-score" and "four-score", respectively. For example, the number 75 is called , lit. "three-score-and ten-five". The Basque nationalist Sabino Arana proposed a vigesimal digit system to match the spoken language, and, as an alternative, a reform of the spoken language to make it decimal, but both are mostly forgotten.
 In the £sd currency system (used in the United Kingdom pre-1971), there were 20 shillings (worth 12 pence each) to the pound. Under the decimal system introduced in 1971 (1 pound equals 100 new pence instead of 240 pence in the old system), the shilling coins still in circulation were re-valued at 5 pence (no more were minted and the shilling coin was demonetised in 1990).
 In the imperial weight system there are twenty hundredweight in a ton.
 In English, the name of the cardinal number 20 is most commonly phrased with the word 'twenty'. Counting by the score has been used historically; for example, the famous opening of the Gettysburg Address, "Four score and seven years ago...", refers to the signing of the Declaration of Independence in 1776, 87 years earlier. In the King James Bible, the term score is used over 130 times, though a single score is always expressed as "twenty". Score is still occasionally used to denote groups of 20 analogously to the use of dozen to quantify groups of 12.
 Other languages have terms similar to score, such as Danish and Norwegian .
 In regions where greater aspects of the Brythonic Celtic languages have not survived in modern dialect, sheep enumeration systems that are vigesimal are recalled to the present day. See .

Software applications 

Open Location Code uses a word-safe version of base 20 for its geocodes. The characters in this alphabet were chosen to avoid accidentally forming words. The developers scored all possible sets of 20 letters in 30 different languages for likelihood of forming words, and chose a set that formed as few recognizable words as possible. The alphabet also is intended to reduce typographical errors by avoiding visually similar digits, and is case-insensitive.

Related observations
 Among multiples of 10, 20 is described in a special way in some languages. Similarly, in Semitic languages such as Arabic and Hebrew, the numbers 30, 40 ... 90 are expressed by morphologically plural forms of the words for the numbers 3, 4 ... 9, but the number 20 is expressed by a morphologically plural form of the word for 10. The Japanese language has a special word (hatachi) for 20 years (of age), and for the 20th day of the month (hatsuka).
 In some languages (e.g. English, Slavic languages and German), the names of the two-digit numbers from 11 to 19 consist of one word, but the names of the two-digit numbers from 21 on consist of two words. So for example, the English words eleven (11), twelve (12), thirteen (13) etc., as opposed to twenty-one (21), twenty-two (22), twenty-three (23), etc. In French, this is true up to 16. In a number of other languages (such as Hebrew), the names of the numbers from 11 to 19 contain two words, but one of these words is a special "teen" form, which is different from the ordinary form of the word for the number 10, and it may in fact be only found in these names of the numbers 11–19.
 Cantonese and Wu Chinese frequently use the single unit  (Cantonese yàh, Shanghainese nyae or ne, Mandarin niàn) for twenty, in addition to the fully decimal  (Cantonese yìh sàhp, Shanghainese el sah, Mandarin èr shí) which literally means "two ten". Equivalents exist for 30 and 40 ( and  respectively: Mandarin sà and xì), but these are more seldom used. This is a historic remnant of a vigesimal system.
 Although Khmer numerals have represented a decimal positional notation system since at least the 7th century, Old Khmer, or Angkorian Khmer, also possessed separate symbols for the numbers 10, 20, and 100. Each multiple of 20 or 100 would require an additional stroke over the character, so the number 47 was constructed using the 20 symbol with an additional upper stroke, followed by the symbol for number 7. This suggests that spoken Angkorian Khmer used a vigesimal system.
 Thai uses the term  (yi sip) for 20. Other multiples of ten consist of the base number, followed by the word for ten, e.g.  (sam sip), lit. three ten, for thirty. The yi of yi sip is different from the number two in other positions, which is สอง (song).  Nevertheless, yi sip is a loan word from Chinese.
 Lao similarly forms multiples of ten by putting the base number in front of the word ten, so  (sam sip), litt. three ten, for thirty. The exception is twenty, for which the word  (xao) is used. ( sao is also used in the North-Eastern and Northern dialects of Thai, but not in standard Thai.)
 The Kharosthi numeral system behaves like a partial vigesimal system.

Examples in Mesoamerican languages

Powers of twenty in Yucatec Maya and Nahuatl

Counting in units of twenty 
This table shows the Maya numerals and the number names in Yucatec Maya, Nahuatl in modern orthography and in Classical Nahuatl.

Notes

Further reading
Karl Menninger: Number words and number symbols: a cultural history of numbers; translated by Paul Broneer from the revised German edition. Cambridge, Mass.: M.I.T. Press, 1969 (also available in paperback: New York: Dover, 1992  )
Levi Leonard Conant: The Number Concept: Its Origin and Development; New York, New York: Macmillan & Co, 1931. Project Gutenberg EBook

Positional numeral systems